Rouessé-Vassé is a commune in the Sarthe department in the region of Pays de la Loire in north-western France. Its inhabitants are called les Rouesséens.

Geography
The Vègre has its source in the commune.

See also
Communes of the Sarthe department
Parc naturel régional Normandie-Maine

References

External links
Official Website

Communes of Sarthe